Ao Vivo e Acústico no Som do Mato is the fourth album from Brazilian blues/rock band O Bando do Velho Jack, and was released in 2004. This album was recorded live and unplugged, and was also released in DVD.

Track listing
 "Sangue latino"
 "Ticket to Ride"
 "Cavaleiro da lua"
 "All My Love"
 "Great Balls of Fire"
 "Palavras erradas"
 "Corda bamba"
 "Como ser feliz ganhando pouco"
 "Longe de você"
 "Cão de guarda"
 "Proud Mary"
 "Trem do Pantanal"

References

O Bando do Velho Jack albums
2004 live albums